The 1966 Mississippi State Bulldogs football team represented Mississippi State University during the 1966 NCAA University Division football season. After the season, head coach Paul E. Davis was fired, along with athletic director Wade Walker.

Schedule

References

Mississippi State
Mississippi State Bulldogs football seasons
Mississippi State Bulldogs football